Killamery is a village in County Kilkenny, Ireland. It was the site of a famous monastery (c. 632) under the abbacy of St. Gobban, who died 639 and was buried in the hallowed grounds of St.Fintan of Clonenagh's Abbey, County Laois.

Killamery High Cross is part of the Ossory group of High crosses. This "west Ossory group" also includes the Celtic crosses at Ahenny, Kilkieran and Tibberaghny. Two bullauns and a holy well are also found nearby.

The village is located near the County Tipperary border on the N76 National secondary road, halfway between Kilkenny to the northeast and Clonmel to the southwest. 

There is one public house in the village, "The Auld House".

Killamery Hill was known in Old Irish as Dromm Derg (modern Irish: Drom Dearg) meaning "red ridge", and is mentioned in a number of Fenian Cycle poems by this name.

See also
 List of towns and villages in Ireland   
 List of abbeys and priories in Ireland (County Kilkenny)

References

External links
Killamery brooch
Killamery High Cross

Cross symbols
High crosses in the Republic of Ireland
Irish culture
Towns and villages in County Kilkenny